Marjatta Raita (17 February 1944, Pori – 27 September 2007) was a Finnish actress, who was best known for her role as Elisabeth Turhapuro in the Uuno Turhapuro movies directed by Spede Pasanen.

Raita also appeared in many other films, although she acted mainly in theater. She studied in a theater school in 1962–1965.

Born in Pori, Marjatta Raita's parents were Eino and Valli Raita, both actors.

She was married to Finnish actor Aarno Sulkanen, by whom she had two children. She died in Helsinki in 2007, aged 63, shortly after being diagnosed with cancer.

External links
 

1944 births
2007 deaths
People from Pori
Finnish film actresses
Finnish stage actresses
Deaths from cancer in Finland